Syed Essa Noori (born 1 January 1953) is a Pakistani politician who was a member of the National Assembly of Pakistan, from August 2013 to May 2018.

Early life
He was born on 1 January 1953.

Political career

He was elected to the National Assembly of Pakistan as a candidate of Balochistan National Party (Mengal) (BNP-M) from Constituency NA-272 (Kech-cum-Gwadar) in by-election held in August 2013. He received 15,835 votes and defeated Muhammad Yasin Baloch, a candidate of National Party.

References

Living people
Baloch people
Pakistani MNAs 2013–2018
People from Balochistan, Pakistan
National Party (Pakistan) politicians
1953 births